This is a list of Mazu temples, dedicated to Mazu (媽祖) also known as Tian Shang Sheng Mu (天上聖母) or Tian Hou (天后) Chinese Goddess of Sea and Patron Deity of fishermen, sailors and any occupations related to sea/ocean, also regarded as Ancestral Deity for Lin (林) Clan.

Australia

Burma (Myanmar)

China

Mainland China

Hong Kong

Macao

Taiwan

Japan

Malaysia

Philippines

Singapore

Thailand

United States

Vietnam

References

Citations

Bibliography
 .